is a Japanese manga series written and illustrated by Keiko Takemiya. It was serialized in the manga magazine Shūkan Shōjo Comic from 1976 to 1980, and in the manga magazine Petit Flower from 1981 to 1984.

The series was developed and published amid a significant transitional period for  manga (manga for girls), as the medium shifted from an audience composed primarily of children to an audience of adolescents and young adults. This shift was characterized by the emergence of narratively more complex stories focused on politics, psychology, and sexuality, and came to be embodied by a new generation of  manga artists collectively referred to as the Year 24 Group, of which Takemiya was a member.

An anime film adaptation of the series, was released as an original video animation (home video) in 1987.

Synopsis

The series is set in late 19th-century France, primarily at the fictional Lacombrade Academy, an all-boys boarding school located on the outskirts of the city of Arles in Provence.

Serge Battour, the teenaged son of a French viscount and a Roma woman, is sent to Lacombrade at the request of his late father. He is roomed with Gilbert Cocteau, a misanthropic student who is ostracized by the school's pupils and professors for his truancy and sexual relations with older male students. Serge's efforts to befriend his roommate and Gilbert's simultaneous efforts both to drive away and to seduce Serge form a complicated and disruptive relationship between the pair.

Gilbert's apparent cruelty and promiscuity are the result of a lifetime of neglect and abuse, as perpetrated chiefly by his ostensible uncle Auguste Beau. Auguste is a respected figure in French high society who has physically, emotionally, and sexually abused Gilbert since he was a child. His manipulation of Gilbert is so significant that Gilbert believes that the two are in love, and he remains beguiled by Auguste even after he later learns that he is not his uncle, but his biological father.

Despite threats of ostracism and violence, Serge perseveres in his attempts to bond with Gilbert, and the two eventually become friends and lovers. Faced with rejection by the faculty and students of Lacombrade, Gilbert and Serge flee to Paris and live for a short while as paupers. Gilbert is unable to escape the trauma of his past, and descends into a life of drug use and prostitution. While hallucinating under the influence of opium, he runs in front of a moving carriage and dies under its wheels, convinced that he has seen Auguste. Some of the pair's friends, who have recently rediscovered the couple, find and console the traumatized Serge.

Characters
The transliteration of the characters' names is sourced from the Italian edition of the manga, which the author approved.

Primary characters
 
 
 A fourteen-year-old student at Lacombrade from an aristocratic family in Marseille. He is the illegitimate child of his mother Anne Marie and her brother-in-law Auguste Beau, the latter of whom has abused Gilbert physically, emotionally, and sexually since he was a child. This abuse has left Gilbert as an antisocial cynic, unable to express love or affection except through sex. Gilbert is initially antagonistic and violent towards his new roommate Serge, and rejects his early attempts to befriend him. Serge's persistent altruism slowly wins Gilbert over, and the two flee to Paris as lovers. Gilbert has difficulty adjusting to their new lives of genteel poverty and begins using drugs and engaging in prostitution, and dies after being struck by a carriage while under the influence of opium.
 
 
 A fourteen-year-old student at Lacombrade, and heir to an aristocratic house. The orphaned son of a French viscount and a Roma woman who faces discrimination for his mixed ethnicity, Serge is a musical prodigy with a noble and humanistic sense of morality. Despite Gilbert's initial ill treatment of him, he remains devoted in his attempts to help and understand him. His attraction to Gilbert causes him confusion and distress, particularly when he finds that he can depend on neither the church nor his friends for guidance and support. He gradually grows closer to Gilbert as they become friends and later lovers, and the two flee Lacombrade together.

Secondary characters
 
 
 Gilbert's legal uncle, later revealed to be his biological father. Adopted into the house of Cocteau as a child, Auguste was raped by his elder step-brother in his own youth and has abused Gilbert from a young age. At first attempting to raise Gilbert to be an "obedient pet", he later works to transform him into a "pure" and "artistic" individual through neglect and manipulation of Gilbert's obsessive love for him. Upon learning of Serge's relationship with Gilbert, he works to separate the pair.
 
 
 An eccentric, iconoclastic classmate of Serge and Gilbert and a close friend of the former. A super senior who is dismissive of religion and classical education, he insists upon the importance of science and takes it upon himself to teach Serge about sexuality. Though mildly attracted to Gilbert, he is the most frankly heterosexual of Serge's confidants, and helps to introduce Serge to women.
 
 
 Serge's first friend at Lacombrade. A gentle, pious boy who struggles with his attraction to Gilbert.
 
 
 The sadistic student superintendent at Lacombrade, nicknamed the "White Prince". A distant relative of the Cocteau family, he was raped by Auguste at the age of 15. Rosemarine cooperates with Auguste's manipulation of Gilbert, but forms a friendship with Serge and ultimately aids Gilbert and Serge in their escape to Paris.
 
 A student supervisor at Lacombrade, and Rosemarine's childhood friend. His aristocratic family's fortune was lost with the death of his father, and he is only able to attend Lacombrade through his intelligence and friendship with Rosemarine. He provides comfort and guidance to Gilbert and Rosemarine through their troubles.

Development

Context

Keiko Takemiya made her debut as a manga artist in 1967, and though her early works attracted the attention of manga magazine editors, none achieved any particular critical or commercial success. Her debut occurred in the context of a restrictive  manga (girls' manga) publishing culture: stories were marketed to an audience of children, were focused on uncomplicated subject material such as familial drama or romantic comedy, and favored Cinderella-like female protagonists defined by their passivity. Beginning in the 1970s, a new generation of  artists emerged who created manga stories that were more psychologically complex, dealt directly with topics of politics and sexuality, and were aimed at an audience of teenage readers. This grouping of artists, of which Takemiya was a member, came to be collectively referred to as the Year 24 Group. The group contributed significantly to the development of  manga by expanding the genre to incorporate elements of science fiction, historical fiction, adventure fiction, and same-sex romance: both male–male ( and ) and female–female.

Takemiya was a close friend to fellow Year 24 Group member Moto Hagio, with whom she shared a rented house in Ōizumigakuenchō, Nerima, Tokyo, from 1971 to 1973. The house was nicknamed the "Ōizumi Salon", and came to be an important gathering point for Year 24 Group members and their affiliates. Their friend and next-door neighbor  was a significant influence on both artists: though Masuyama was not a manga artist, she was a  manga enthusiast motivated by a desire to elevate the genre from its status as a frivolous distraction for children to a serious literary art form, and introduced Takemiya and Hagio to literature, magazines, and films that came to inspire their works.

Masuyama introduced Takemiya and Hagio to Beneath the Wheel (1906), Demian (1919), and Narcissus and Goldmund (1932); Demian was especially impactful on both artists, directly influencing the plot and setting of both Takemiya's  and Hagio's own major contribution to the  genre, The Heart of Thomas (1974). Though none of Hesse's stories are explicitly homoerotic, they inspired the artists through their depictions of strong bonds between male characters, their boarding school settings, and their focus on the internal psychology of their male protagonists.

Production

She wrote a detailed outline of the plot in December of that year, and drew the first 50 pages of the manga in a sketchbook in January 1971. Takemiya showed the sketchbook draft to multiple editors, but none were interested in publishing the series, citing its controversial subject material. Several editors advised her to move the opening scene of the series, which depicts Gilbert in bed with an older male student, to later in the story; she refused, stating, "I want to put the page that best reflects the story at the beginning."

At the time, manga censorship codes specifically forbade depictions of male–female sex, but ostensibly permitted depictions of male–male sex. Takemiya's decision to focus on male over female protagonists – still a relatively new practice in  manga at the time – was born from her desire to write a sexually explicit story that she believed would appeal to female readers. Per Takemiya, "if there is a sex scene between a boy and a girl, [readers] don't like it because it seems too real. It leads to topics like getting pregnant or getting married, and that's too real. But if it's two boys, they can avoid that and concentrate on the love aspect." In developing the main characters of the series, Takemiya considered that Gilbert's complex background necessitated the creation of an equally compelling background for Serge, prompting her to place focus on Serge's deceased parents.

In the December 1970 issue of Bessatsu Shōjo Comic, Takemiya published a one-shot (standalone single chapter) manga titled  ("Snow and Stars and Angels and..."), which was later re-published under the title  ("In the Sunroom"). Takemiya describes the one-shot as a "compact" version of : both stories focus on a Roma teenager named Serge Battour, who enters a relationship with a blond boy who dies at the conclusion of the story. Aware that a male–male romance story was likely to be heavily revised or rejected by her editor, Takemiya intentionally submitted  immediately before the magazine's publication deadline.

Takemiya contributed a "one-page theater" (a page in which an author discusses miscellaneous thoughts and impressions with essay-like illustrations) to Shūkan Shōjo Comic in September 1973, in which she described her desire to write . She noted that it had been three years since she conceived of the story and characters, and that she still wished to see it published. She told readers, "Please remember the name 'Gilbert'. I'm sure I will draw it!" Along with the editorial barriers she faced, Takemiya found it difficult to develop the story as she felt she lacked sufficient knowledge of its European setting. In 1973, Takemiya traveled to Europe with Hagio, Masuyama, and Year 24 Group member Ryoko Yamagishi. She stated that the trip made her "more concerned with details. After I knew how to make a stone-paved street, I also watched repairs on it and stared at the blocks which were used." Takemiya continued to visit Europe annually, staying in different countries for a month each time.

In an effort to overcome the low level of editorial freedom and autonomy that was preventing her from publishing , Takemiya sought to build her profile as an artist by creating a manga series that would have mass appeal. The preview, titled , was included at the end of the volume without notice or explanation. In all, it took nearly seven years for Takemiya to, in her words, "earn the right" to publish the series.

Release
 began serialization in the February 29, 1976 ( 10) issue of Shūkan Shōjo Comic. It attracted controversy for its sexual depictions, particularly its opening male–male sex scene and its depictions of sadomasochism, incest, and rape. Takemiya has stated that she was concerned how parent–teacher associations would react to the series, as Shūkan Shōjo Comic publisher Shogakukan was a "stricter" company best known for publishing academic magazines for schoolchildren. Reader letters in Shūkan Shōjo Comic were divided between those who were offended by the subject material of the series, and those who praised its narrative complexity and explicit representations of sex. Gilbert was initially unpopular with readers, though as the series progressed to depict his backstory and early childhood, he subsequently became more popular than Serge.

In 1980, Shūkan Shōjo Comic editor  became the founding editor of Petit Flower, a new manga magazine aimed at an audience of adult women that published titles with mature subject material.  moved to the new magazine, and the last chapter of the series published in Shūkan Shōjo Comic was released in the November 5, 1980 (No. 21) issue. Serialization continued in Petit Flower beginning in the Winter 1981 issue (cover dated as February 1981), where it continued until the conclusion of the series in the June 1984 issue.

The series, which was significantly longer than Takemiya's previous works, was collected as seventeen  volumes published under Shogakukan's Flower Comics imprint from May 1977 to August 1984. It was re-released as nine hardcover volumes published under Shogakukan's Sōsho imprint from July 1988 to March 1989. Since then,  has been reprinted several times by different Japanese publishers, including a nine-volume edition published as part of "The Complete Keiko Takemiya" collection under Kadokawa Shoten's Asuka Comics DX imprint from August 1990 to March 1991; a four-volume  edition published under Chuokoron-Shinsha's Chuko Aizōban imprint from August to November 1993; a ten-volume  edition published under Hakusensha's Bunko imprint from March to September 1995; and an eight-volume  edition published under Chuokoron-Shinsha's Chuko Bunko Comic-ban imprint from July 2002 to January 2003.

 was translated and published outside of Japan for the first time in 2018, by Spanish-language publisher Milky Way Ediciones. It was released in ten omnibus volumes based on the 1995 Japanese  edition, featuring color pages and new cover art chosen by Takemiya. The series was also published by Italian-language publisher  in late 2018, under their J-Pop Manga imprint. It was initially released in a ten-volume box set, the individual volumes later being released once a month.

Themes and analysis

Gender
Takemiya has stated that her use of protagonists that blur gender distinctions was done intentionally, "to mentally liberate girls from the sexual restrictions imposed on us [as women]". By portraying male characters with physical traits typical of female characters in manga – such as slender bodies, long hair, and large eyes – the presumed female reader is invited to self-identify with the male protagonist. This device led psychologist Hayao Kawai to remark in his analysis of  that "perhaps no other work has expressed the inner world of the adolescent girl to such an extent".

This self-identification among girls and women assumes many forms; art critic Midori Matsui considers how this representation appeals to adolescent female readers by harking back to a sexually undifferentiated state of childhood, while also allowing them to vicariously contemplate the sexual attractiveness of boys. James Welker notes in his field work that members of Japan's lesbian community reported being influenced by manga featuring characters who blur gender distinctions, specifically citing  and The Rose of Versailles by Year 24 Group member Riyoko Ikeda. This self-identification is expressed in negative terms by psychologist  who sees  manga as a "narcissistic space" in which  operate simultaneously as "the perfect object of [the readers'] desire to love and their desire for identification", seeing  as the "apex" of this tendency.

She cites as evidence Gilbert's overt disgust towards women, arguing that his misogynistic statements serve to draw the reader's attention to the subordinate position women occupy in society; as the female reader is ostensibly meant to self-identify with Gilbert, these statements expose "the mechanisms by which women cannot help falling into a state of self-hatred".

Sex and sexual violence

 allowed  manga artists to depict sex, which had long been considered taboo in the medium. There has been significant academic focus on the motivations of Japanese women who read and created  in the 1970s, with manga scholar Deborah Shamoon considering how  permitted the exploration of sex and eroticism in a way that was "distanced from the girl readers' own bodies", as male–male sex is removed from female concerns of marriage and pregnancy. She examines how the abuse suffered by Gilbert has rendered him as "a creature who cannot exist without sexual love" and who thus suffers "the pain of passivity". By applying passivity, a trait that is stereotypically associated with women, to male characters, she argues that Takemiya is able to depict sexual violence "in a purified form and in a way that protects the reader from its raw pain". These scenes of sexual violence "would be all too realistic if a woman were portrayed as the victim"; by portraying the subject as a man, "women are freed from the position of always being the one 'done to', and are able to take on the viewpoint of the 'doer', and also the viewpoint of the 'looker'."

Midori Matsui similarly argues Gilbert exists as a "pure object of the male gaze", an "effeminate and beautiful boy whose presence alone provokes the sado-machochistic desire of older males to rape, humiliate, and treat him as a sexual commodity". She argues that Gilbert represents a parody of the femme fatale, and at the same time "his sexuality evokes the subversive element of abjection." That is to say, Gilbert's backstory as a victim of rape – a status that is often associated with women – allows the female reader to identify with him, and experience an abject and vicarious fear that reflects her own fear of rape. Gilbert's contradictory status as both femme fatale and sexual assault victim therefore contradicts the stereotype of "feminine power of seduction that usurps the rationality of the masculine subject", at the same time reinforcing "conventional metaphors of feminine sexuality as a dark seducer".

Kazuko Suzuki considers that although society often shuns and looks down upon women who are raped in reality,  depicts male characters who are raped as still "imbued with innocence" and typically still loved by their rapists after the act. She cites  as the primary work that gave rise to this trope in  manga, noting how the narrative suggests that individuals who are "honest to themselves" and love only one other person monogamously are regarded as "innocent". That is, so long as the protagonists of  "continue to pursue their supreme love within an ideal human relationship, they can forever retain their virginity at the symbolic level, despite having repeated sex in the fictional world".

Occidentalism

Takemiya has stated that interest in Europe was a "characteristic of the times", noting that gravure fashion magazines for girls such as An An and Non-no often included European topics in their editorial coverage. She sees the fascination as stemming in part from sensitivities around depicting non-Japanese settings in manga in the aftermath of the Second World War, stating that "you could draw anything about America and Europe, but not so, about 'Asia' as seen in Japan".

Manga scholar Rebecca Suter asserts that the recurrence of Christian themes and imagery throughout the series – crucifixes, Bibles, churches, Madonnas and angels appear both in the diegesis and as symbolic representations in non-narrative artwork – can be seen as a sort of Occidentalism. She argues that the series' appropriation of western religious symbols and attitudes for creative purposes "parallels and subverts" the Orientalist tendency to view Asia as more spiritual, "superstitious, and backwards".

Works by the Year 24 Group often used western literary tropes, especially those associated with the Bildungsroman genre, to stage what Midori Matsui describes as "a psychodrama of the adolescent ego". In this regard, several commentators have contrasted  to Moto Hagio's The Heart of Thomas through their shared inspirations from the Bildungsroman novels of Herman Hesse. Both  and Thomas follow similar narrative trajectories, focusing on a tragic romance between boys in a European setting, and where the death of one boy figures heavily into the plot.  is significantly more sexually explicit than both The Heart of Thomas and Hesse's novels, with anime and manga scholar Minori Ishida noting that "Takemiya in particular draws on latent romance and eroticism between some male characters in Hesse's writing". Midori Matsui considers  as "ostensibly a Bildungsroman" that is "surreptitious pornography for girls" through its depiction of male characters who openly express and act upon their sexual desires, contrasting the largely non-sexual Heart of Thomas.

Related media

Adaptations

An anime film adaptation, was released by Pony Canyon as an original video animation (OVA) on November 6, 1987. The sixty-minute film was produced by Shogakukan, Herald Enterprise, and Konami and directed by Yoshikazu Yasuhiko, with Sachiko Kamimura as animation director. Animation for the film was done in cooperation between Tranquilizer Product Company, Kugatsusha, Triangle Staff, and Tokyo Media Connections. Sanctus adapts the introductory chapters of the manga, bookended by scenes of a now-adult Serge re-visiting Lacombrade; multiple sequels were planned, but were never produced. Internationally, Sanctus was licensed by Italian distributor Yamato Video in 2006, which released the film as a DVD containing both the original Japanese audio and an Italian dub starring Marisa Della Pasqua as the voice of young Serge and Paola Della Pasqua as the voice of Gilbert.

A radio drama adapting the first volume of  aired on TBS Radio, with Mann Izawa as scriptwriter and Hiromi Go as the voice of Gilbert.

Tie-ins
, a remix album of Gilbert no Requiem, was released in 1985.

In 2016, Takarajimasha published , a limited edition artist's book containing thirty-two  illustrations chosen by Takemiya and new illustrations originally drawn by Takemiya for her solo art exhibitions.

Sequels
The novel was written by Norie Masuyama, under the pen name Norisu Hāze. During their research, they encounter , a descendant of the Cocteau family related to Gilbert. The novel's chapters were collected into three hardcover volumes published by Kōfūsha Shuppan from 1992 to 1994, each featuring an original cover illustration by Takemiya. The hardcover editions were re-released by Fukkan.com in 2018, to mark Takemiya's 50th anniversary as a manga artist. The Fukkan.com re-release includes Takemiya's illustrations from the original June serialization, which were not included in the Kōfūsha Shuppan edition.

Set three years after Gilbert's death, the story focuses on the relationship between Jules and Rosemarine, who meet again by chance at Serge's piano concert in Paris.  was written and illustrated by Takemiya, and was published in her artist's book , released by Kadokawa Shoten in November 1991.

Reception and legacy

Critical response
Roughly 5million copies of collected volumes of  have been sold as of 2019.

Although some Japanese critics dismissed  as a "second rate imitation" of The Heart of Thomas upon its initial release, it has received wide critical acclaim, and has been described as a "masterpiece" of the  genre. Masaki Satō, a gay writer who originated the  debate of the 1990s, said he was "saved" by manga like , and poet and playwright Shūji Terayama compared the series' publication to "the great events that occurred in the Parisian literary world", likening it to Story of O by Anne Desclos and Justine by the Marquis de Sade and writing that "from now on, comics will probably be called ' and thereafter'". The series inspired several works: Kentaro Miura cited  as an influence on his manga series Berserk, stating that both  and The Rose of Versailles prompted him to change his approach to the series and write a story "with sad and painful human relationships and emotions"; Chiho Saito believes that  heavily influenced the anime and manga series Revolutionary Girl Utena she developed as part of the artist collective Be-Papas, noting the many similarities between the works in a 2016 essay she wrote about Takemiya.

In an overview of the filmography of Yoshikazu Yasuhiko for Anime News Network, critic Michael Toole praised  as a "subtle piece" that is "vibrant and beautiful", favorably comparing it to the 1981 film adaptation of Takemiya's . In a review of the film for THEM Anime Reviews, Julian Malerman wrote that the short length of Sanctus makes it feel "like a prelude, or a summary" of the original manga, describing it as it "collection of compelling but largely disconnected scenes". He nonetheless offers praise for its visual direction, particularly its "gorgeous hand-painted background art" and character designs, and the central relationship between Gilbert and Serge, which he assesses as "solid enough, if rather melodramatic".

Impact
 is credited with widely popularizing the  genre. Yukari Fujimoto writes that  (along with The Heart of Thomas and ) made male homosexuality part of "the everyday landscape of  manga" and "one of its essential elements", and manga scholar Kazuko Suzuki cites  as "one of the first attempts to depict true bonding or ideal relationships through pure male homosexual love". James Welker concurs that  and The Heart of Thomas "almost certainly helped foster increasingly diverse male–male romance narratives within the broader  manga genre from the mid-1970s onward".

In particular,  contributed significantly to the development of male–male romance manga through its depiction of sex. This trend towards sex-focused narratives in male–male romance manga accelerated with the founding of the manga magazine June in 1978, for which Takemiya was an editor and major contributor. June was the first major manga magazine to publish  and  exclusively, and is credited with launching the careers of dozens of  manga artists.

 has been invoked in public debates on sexual expression in manga, particularly debates on the ethics and legality of manga depicting minors in sexual scenarios. In 2010, a revision to the Tokyo Metropolitan Ordinance Regarding the Healthy Development of Youths was introduced that would have restricted published media containing sexual depictions of characters who appeared to be minors, a proposal that was criticized by multiple anime and manga professionals for disproportionately targeting their industry. In a 2016 interview with the BBC, Takemiya responded to the charge that depictions of rape in  condone the sexualization of minors by stating that "such things do happen in real life. Hiding it will not make it go away. And I tried to portray the resilience of these boys, how they managed to survive and regain their lives after experiencing violence."

Notes

References

Bibliography

External links
 
 
 

1976 manga
1984 comics endings
1987 anime OVAs
Comics set in the 19th century
Comics set in France
Drama anime and manga
Keiko Takemiya
Romance anime and manga
School life in anime and manga
Shogakukan franchises
Shogakukan manga
Shōjo manga
Shōnen-ai anime and manga
Winners of the Shogakukan Manga Award for shōjo manga
Winners of the Shogakukan Manga Award for shōnen manga